Jangalak may refer to:
 Jangal, Khash
 Jangaluk